Gonzalo Maldonado (died 1530) was a Roman Catholic prelate who served as Bishop of Ciudad Rodrigo (1525–1530).

On 3 July 1525, during the papacy of Pope Clement VII, Maldonado was appointed as Bishop of Ciudad Rodrigo.
He served in this post until his death on 29 June 1530.

References

External links and additional sources
 (for Chronology of Bishops) 
 (for Chronology of Bishops) 

16th-century Roman Catholic bishops in Spain
Bishops appointed by Pope Clement VII
1530 deaths